Ab-e Mozhgan (also Romanized as Āb-e Mozhgān) is a village in Abezhdan Rural District, Abezhdan District, Andika County, Khuzestan Province, Iran. At the 2006 census, its population was 109, in 16 families.

References 

Populated places in Andika County